Hymns to the Silence is the twenty-first studio album by Northern Irish singer-songwriter Van Morrison. It was his first studio double album. Morrison recorded the album in 1990 in Beckington at Wool Hall Studios and in London at Townhouse and Westside Studios.

When Hymns to the Silence was released in 1991, it reached number five on the UK Albums Chart and received positive reviews from critics. Morrison's use of various musical styles was well received, as were the more worldly-themed songs on an otherwise spiritual album.

Recording and composition
The album of songs was recorded during sessions at Wool Hall Studios in Beckington, Townhouse, London and Westside Studios, London with Mick Glossop as engineer, except for the song "Take Me Back".  It was recorded in 1990 at Pavilion Studios in London with Martin Hayles and Mick Glossop as engineers.

"Why Must I Always Explain?" was set to the same melody as 1970s "Tupelo Honey". There were two hymns. "Be Thou My Vision" and "Just a Closer Walk With Thee". The song, "Carrying a Torch" was also included on Tom Jones's album by the same name, along with three other Morrison compositions from "Hymns to the Silence".

Critical reception

In a review for Time, Jay Cocks said "Hymns focuses and redefines Morrison's themes over his long career, rather like a museum retrospective already in progress.  It dips deep into autobiography, spiritual speculation and blues mythology for its themes." Rolling Stone magazine's Elysa Gardner said despite overblown hymns such as "Take Me Back" and "Pagan Streams", Morrison appropriates a variety of musical styles into both joyful and poignant songs on an album that "brims with the consistent passion that continues to make Morrison fascinating". Alec Foege from Spin argued that its music is more eclectic than the entirety of Morrison's 1980s albums, while the lyrics prove he can reconcile his Christian faith with more worldly themes, allowing for "a refreshingly individualistic soul-searching". In The Village Voice, Robert Christgau lamented the amount of filler throughout the two discs in the form of several hymns and love songs, but complimented the secular songs about true love, ordinary life, and "the days before rock and roll", finding the album "more affecting than you'd figure" overall. It was voted the 21st best album of 1991 in The Village Voices annual Pazz & Jop critics poll.

In a retrospective review, AllMusic's Michael Gallucci felt Hymns to the Silence was Morrison's best album during the 1990s, although he also found it too long and essentially a "spirited rewrite" of his previous record Enlightenment. Rob Sheffield was more critical in The Rolling Stone Album Guide (2004), deeming it a "complex and self-involved" imitation of Avalon Sunset with a few exceptional songs.

Track listing
All songs written by Van Morrison unless noted.

Disc one
"Professional Jealousy" – 3:42
"I'm Not Feeling It Anymore" – 6:34
"Ordinary Life" – 3:29
"Some Peace of Mind" – 6:24
"So Complicated" – 3:18
"I Can't Stop Loving You" - (Gibson) – 3:54 (With The Chieftains)
"Why Must I Always Explain?" – 3:50
"Village Idiot" – 3:13
"See Me Through, Pt. 2 (Just a Closer Walk with Thee)" - (Traditional) – 3:10
"Take Me Back" – 9:11

Disc two
"By His Grace" – 2:34
"All Saints Day" – 2:28
"Hymns to the Silence" – 9:42
"On Hyndford Street" – 5:17
"Be Thou My Vision" - (Traditional) – 3:49 (With The Chieftains)
"Carrying a Torch" – 4:26
"Green Mansions" – 3:38
"Pagan Streams" – 3:38
"Quality Street" - (Morrison, Rebennack) – 3:57
"It Must Be You" – 4:08
"I Need Your Kind of Loving" – 4:31

Personnel
Van Morrison - vocal, guitar, harmonica, alto saxophone
Haji Ahkba - flugelhorn
Derek Bell - synthesizer
The Chieftains
Terry Disley - piano
Neil Drinkwater - accordion, piano, synthesizer
Candy Dulfer - alto saxophone
Dave Early - drums, percussion
Georgie Fame - piano, Hammond organ, backing vocals
Eddie Friel - piano, Hammond organ, synthesizer
Steve Gregory - flute, baritone saxophone
Carol Kenyon - backing vocals
Katie Kissoon - backing vocals
Steve Pearce - bass
Paul Robinson - drums
Nicky Scott - bass
Kate St John - cor anglais

Charts
Album - Billboard (North America)

Album - UK Album Chart

Notes

References
Heylin, Clinton (2003). Can You Feel the Silence? Van Morrison: A New Biography, Chicago Review Press 
Hinton, Brian (1997). Celtic Crossroads: The Art of Van Morrison, Sanctuary, 
Turner, Steve (1993). Van Morrison: Too Late to Stop Now, Viking Penguin,

External links
Time Review Hymns to the Silence

Van Morrison albums
1991 albums
Mercury Records albums
Albums produced by Van Morrison